Diet in Hinduism signifies the diverse traditions found across the Indian subcontinent. Hindu scriptures promote a vegetarian dietary ideal based on the concept of ahimsa—non-violence and compassion towards all beings. According to a Pew Research Center survey, 44% of Hindus say they are vegetarian.

History
By mid-1st millennium BCE, all three major Indian religions – Hinduism, Jainism and Buddhism – were championing non-violence as an ethical value, and something that affected one's rebirth. By about 200 CE, food and feasting on animal slaughter were widely considered as a form of violence against life forms, and became a religious and social taboo. Ralph Fitch, a gentleman merchant of London and one of the earliest English travellers to India wrote a letter home in 1580 stating, "They have a very strange order among them – they worship a cow and esteem much of the cow's dung to paint the walls of their houses ... They eat no flesh, but live by roots and rice and milk."

Diet in Hindu scriptures and texts

The Vedas
Evidence from the Vedas suggests the diet of the Vedic people consisted of cereals, initially barley but later dominated by rice, pulses such as māsha (urad), mudga (moong), and masūra (masoor), vegetables such as lotus roots, lotus stem, bottle gourd and milk products, mainly of cows, but also of buffaloes and goats. The Vedas describe animals including bulls, horses, rams and goats being sacrificed and eaten. Although cows held an elevated position in the Vedas, barren cows were also sacrificed. Even then, the word aghnyā ('not to be eaten', 'inviolable') is used for cows multiple times, with some Rigvedic composers considering the whole bovine species, both cows and bulls, inviolable.

Steven J. Rosen suggests that meat might only have been eaten as part of ritual sacrifices and not otherwise. Acts of animal sacrifice were not fully accepted as there were signs of unease and tension owing to the 'gory brutality of sacrificial butchery' dating back to as early as the older Vedas. The earliest reference to the idea of ahimsa or non-violence to animals (pashu-ahimsa) in any literature, apparently in a moral sense, is found in the Kapisthala Katha Samhita of the Yajurveda (KapS 31.11), written about the 8th century BCE. The Shatapatha Brahmana contains one of the earliest statements against meat eating, and the Chāndogya Upaniṣad, has an injunction against killing 'all living entities'. Injunctions against meat-eating also appear in the Dharmasutras.

Dharmaśāstras
According to Kane, one who is about to eat food should greet the food when it is served to him, should honour it, never speak ill, and never find fault in it.

The Dharmasastra literature, states Patrick Olivelle, admonishes "people not to cook for themselves alone", offer it to the gods, to forefathers, to fellow human beings as hospitality and as alms to the monks and needy. Olivelle claims all living beings are interdependent in matters of food and thus food must be respected, worshipped and taken with care. Olivelle states that the Shastras recommend that when a person sees food, he should fold his hands, bow to it, and say a prayer of thanks.

The reverence for food reaches a state of extreme in the renouncer or monk traditions in Hinduism. The Hindu tradition views procurement and preparation of food as necessarily a violent process, where other life forms and nature are disturbed, in part destroyed, changed and reformulated into something edible and palatable. The mendicants (sannyasin, ascetics) avoid being the initiator of this process, and therefore depend entirely on begging for food that is left over of householders. In pursuit of their spiritual beliefs, states Olivelle, the "mendicants eat other people's left overs". If they cannot find left overs, they seek fallen fruit or seeds left in field after harvest.

The forest hermits of Hinduism, on the other hand, do not even beg for left overs. Their food is wild and uncultivated. Their diet would consist mainly of fruits, roots, leaves, and anything that grows naturally in the forest. They avoided stepping on plowed land, lest they hurt a seedling. They attempted to live a life that minimizes, preferably eliminates, the possibility of harm to any life form.

Manusmriti
The Manusmriti discusses diet in chapter 5, where like other Hindu texts, it includes verses that strongly discourage meat eating, as well as verses where meat eating is declared appropriate in times of adversity and various circumstances, recommending that the meat in such circumstances be produced with minimal harm and suffering to the animal. The verses 5.48-5.52 of Manusmriti explain the reason for avoiding meat as follows (abridged),

In contrast, verse 5.33 of Manusmriti states that a man may eat meat in a time of adversity, verse 5.27 recommends that eating meat is okay if not eating meat may place a person's health and life at risk, while various verses such as 5.31 and 5.39 recommend that the meat be produced as a sacrifice. In verses 3.267 to 3.272, Manusmriti approves of fish and meats of deer, antelope, poultry, goat, sheep, rabbit and others as part of sacrificial food. However, Manusmriti is a law book not a spritiual book. So it permits to eat meat but it doesn't promote. In an exegetical analysis of Manusmriti, Patrick Olivelle states that the document shows opposing views on eating meat was common among ancient Hindus, and that underlying emerging thought on appropriate diet was driven by ethic of non-injury and spiritual thoughts about all life forms, the trend being to reduce the consumption of meat and favour a non-injurious vegetarian lifestyle.

Mahabharata 
Mahabharata contains numerous stories glorifying non-violence towards animals and has some of the strongest statements against slaughter of animals—three chapters of the Epic are dedicated to the evils of meat-eating. Bhisma declares compassion to be the highest religious principle, and compares eating of animal flesh to eating the flesh of one's son. Nominally acknowledging Manu's authorisation of meat-eating in sacrificial context, Bhisma explains to Yudhiṣṭhira that "one who abstains from doing so acquires the same merit as that accrued from the performance of even a horse sacrifice" and that "those desirous of heaven perform sacrifice with seeds instead of animals". It is stated in Mahabharata that animal sacrifices were introduced only when people began to resort to violence in the treta yuga, a less pure and compassionate age, and were not present in the sat yuga, 'the golden age'.

Tirukkuṛaḷ
Another ancient Indian text, the Tirukkuṛaḷ, originally written in the South Indian language of Tamil, states moderate diet as a virtuous lifestyle and criticizes "non-vegetarianism" in its Pulaan Maruthal (abstinence from flesh or meat) chapter, through verses 251 through 260. Verse 251, for instance, questions "how can one be possessed of kindness, who, to increase his own flesh, eats the flesh of other creatures." It also says that "the wise, who are devoid of mental delusions, do not eat the severed body of other creatures" (verse 258), suggesting that "flesh is nothing but the despicable wound of a mangled body" (verse 257). It continues to say that not eating meat is a practice more sacred than the most sacred religious practices ever known (verse 259) and that only those who refrain from killing and eating the kill are worthy of veneration (verse 260). This text, written before 400 CE, and sometimes called the Tamil Veda, discusses eating habits and its role in a healthy life (Mitahara), dedicating Chapter 95 of Book II to it. The Tirukkuṛaḷ states in verses 943 through 945, "eat in moderation, when you feel hungry, foods that are agreeable to your body, refraining from foods that your body finds disagreeable". Valluvar also emphasizes overeating has ill effects on health, in verse 946, as "the pleasures of health abide in the man who eats moderately. The pains of disease dwell with him who eats excessively."

Puranas 
The Puranic texts fiercely oppose violence against animals in many places "despite following the pattern of being constrained by the Vedic imperative to nominally accept it in sacrificial contexts". The most important Puranic text, the Bhagavata Purana goes farthest in repudiating animal sacrifice—refraining from harming all living beings is considered the highest dharma. The text states that the sin of harming animals cannot be washed away by performing "sham sacrifices", just as "mud cannot be washed away by mud". It graphically presents the horrific karmic reactions accrued from the performance of animal sacrifices—those who mercilessly cook animals and birds go to kumbhipaka and are fried in boiling oil and those who perform sham sacrifices are themselves cut to pieces in viśasana hell. The Skanda Purana states that the sages were dismayed by animal sacrifice and considered it against dharma, claiming that sacrifice is supposed to be performed with grains and milk. It narrates that animal sacrifice was only permitted to feed the population during a famine, yet the sages did not slaughter animals even as they died of starvation. The Matsya Purana contains a dialogue between sages who disapprove of violence against animals, preferring rites involving oblations of fruits and vegetables. The text states that the negative karma accrued from violence against animals far outweighs any benefits.

Diet and caste 
Vegetarian castes are regarded to be superior than non-vegetarian caste. Eaters of clean animals like goats and sheep are considered higher compared to those who consume unclean animals like pigs and domesticated fowl. Carcasses eaters are lower to those who consume the meat of animals that have been killed for food. In addition to being an indication of poor social, economic, and ritual status, eating carcasses is considered to be eating impure meat because death makes the animal impure.

Sanskritisation

The process of Sanskritisation, a term coined by M. N. Srinivas in the 1950s, leads lower castes to adopt practices of ritually higher castes in order to improve the status of their community. One of these practices include adoption of a vegetarian diet. Examples of this practice include the Patidar, and other Gujarati Hindu communities who have adopted Vaishnavism, and vegetarianism that goes with it. This was also seen in the north indian Chamar caste.

Contemporary Hindu diet
According to a 2021 Pew Research Center survey, 44% of Hindus say they are vegetarian.

Lacto-vegetarian diet

Vegetarianism is a dietary ideal among many Hindus, based on the concept of ahimsa—non-violence and compassion towards all beings. It is also considered satvic, that is purifying the body and mind lifestyle in some Hindu texts.

Lacto-vegetarianism is favored by many Hindus, which includes milk-based foods and all other non-animal derived foods, but it excludes meat and eggs. There are three main reasons for this: the principle of nonviolence (ahimsa) applied to animals, the intention to offer only vegetarian food to their preferred  deity and then to receive it back as prasad, and the conviction that non-vegetarian food is detrimental for the mind and for spiritual development.

A typical modern urban Hindu lacto-vegetarian meal is based on a combination of grains such as rice and wheat, legumes, green vegetables, and dairy products. Depending on the geographical region the staples may include millet based flatbreads. Fat derived from slaughtered animals is avoided.

A number of Hindus, particularly those  following the Vaishnav tradition, refrain from eating onions and garlic either totally or  during Chaturmas period (roughly July - November of the Gregorian calendar). In Maharashtra, a number of Hindu families also do not eat any  egg plant (Brinjal / Aubergine) preparations during this period. The followers of ISKCON (International Society for Krishna Consciousness, Hare Krishna) abstain from meat, fish, and fowl. The related Pushtimargi sect followers also avoid certain vegetables such as onion, mushrooms and garlic, out of the belief that these are tamas (harmful). The mainly Gujarati Swaminarayan movement members staunchly adhere to a diet that is devoid of meat, eggs,seafood, onions and garlic.

Non-vegetarian diet

A significant portion of Hindus are non-vegetarians, although even those categorised as non-vegetarian eat very little meat—India has significantly lower meat consumption than other regions. Hindus who eat meat, often distinguish all other meat from beef. The respect for cow is part of Hindu belief, and most Hindus avoid meat sourced from cow as cows are treated as a motherly giving animal, considered as another member of the family.
Some Hindus who eat non-vegetarian food abstain from eating non-vegetarian food during festivals such as Janmastami.

Prasad and Naivedya

Prasad or Prasadam is a religious offering in Hinduism. Most often it  is vegetarian food especially cooked for devotees after praise and thanksgiving to a deity. Mahaprasada (also called Bhandarā), is the consecrated food offered to the deity in a Hindu temple which is then distributed and partaken by all the devotees regardless of any orientation.
Prasad is closely linked to the term Naivedya, also spelt Naivedhya', naibedya or Naived(h)yam. The food offered to God is called Naivedya, while the sacred food sanctified and returned by God as a blessing is called Prasad. Naivedya and prasad can be non-vegetarian food prepared from an animal such as goat sacrificed for deity such as Kali in Eastern India, or Chhastisgarh.

Diet on Hindu festivals and religious observations 

Hindu calendar has many festivals and religious observations, and dishes specific to that festival are prepared.

Festival dishes
Hindus prepare special dishes for different festivals. Kheer, and Halwa are two desserts for Diwali. Puran poli, and Gujia are prepared for Holi in different parts of India.

Diet on fasting days 

Hindu people fast on certain days such as Ekadashi, in honor of Vishnu or his Avatars, Chaturthi in honor of Ganesh, Pradosha in honor of Shiva and Parvati, Monday in honor of Shiva, Saturday in honor of Hanuman or Shani, Tuesday in honor of Hanuman and Kartikeya, Sunday in honor of Surya, Thursday in honor of Vishnu or his avatars and Brihaspati, Wednesday in honor of Krishna, Vithoba, Ganesh and Budha and Friday in honor of Mahadevi, Durga, Kali, and Santoshi Mata. Only certain kinds of foods are allowed to be eaten during the fasting period. These include milk and other dairy products such as dahi, fruit and starchy Western food items such as sago, potatoes, purple-red sweet potatoes, amaranth seeds, nuts and shama millet. Popular fasting dishes include Farari chevdo, Sabudana Khichadi or peanut soup.

See also

References

Bibliography
 
 
 
 
 
 
 
 
 
 

Hindu traditions
Hindu law
Ancient Indian law
Indian cuisine
Food law
Vegetarianism and religion
Hindu cuisine